The London Film Critics Circle's British Film of the Year:

List of winners

Multiple winning directors
The following directors have won multiple awards:
4 wins – Mike Leigh (1991, 1996, 2002, 2004)
2 wins – James Ivory (1992, 1993)
2 wins – Joanna Hogg (2019, 2021)

External links
Official website
London Critics' Circle Film Awards at the Internet Movie Database

Awards for best film
British Film